Moyo General Hospital also Moyo Hospital, is a hospital in the Northern Region of Uganda.

Location

The coordinates of Moyo General Hospital are:03°38'59.0"N, 31°43'38.0"E (Latitude:3°38'59.0"N; Longitude:31°43'38.0"E).

Overview
The hospital was built during the late 1960s and was commissioned by Idi Amin in 1972. The hospital infrastructure is dilapidated and the equipment is antiquated or non-functional. The hospital is severely under-staffed, employing only 60 nurses out of the 120 needed. As of January 2016, the facility had no functioning ambulance.

Renovations
In 2013, the government of Uganda secured funding from the World Bank, to repair and renovate certain hospitals, Moyo General Hospital among them. The US$4,541,931.32 contract was awarded to Prism Construction Company Limited. Work that started in February 2014 consists of the following, among others:

 Build  new emergency department (casualty department)
 Build a new, larger outpatient department
 Build a new building to house the diesel-powered electricity generator
 Build a new placenta disposal pit 
 Build a new medical waste disposal pit 
 Build a laundry facility for patients' families
 Build a kitchen and dining room for patients' families
 Build ventilated improved pit latrines for patient families and outpatients
 Construct two new staff houses

The construction started in February 2014 with expected completion in October 2015. However, due to multiple delays, the new expected completion date is June 2016.

See also
List of hospitals in Uganda

References

External links
 Website of Uganda Ministry of Health

Hospitals in Uganda
Moyo District
West Nile sub-region
Northern Region, Uganda